Najma is a 1983 Bangladeshi film starring Razzak and Shabana. It is produced by Shabana's own production house S. S. Productions. She received her third Bangladesh National Film Award for Best Actress for her performance in the film. It also stars Jashim, Khalil Ullah Khan and Anwara.

Cast 
 Shabana
 Razzak
 Jashim
 Anwara

Track listing 
 "Shonen Shonen Sudhijon" - Kumar Biswajit, Sabina Yasmin
 "Fuler Bashor" - Runa Laila, Andrew Kishore
 "Chokhe Chokhe Rag" - Andrew Kishore Runa Laila
 "Shobai Bole Tumi Naki" - Pappu Lahiri

Awards 
Bangladesh National Film Awards
 Best Actress - Shabana

References

1983 films
Bengali-language Bangladeshi films
Films scored by Alauddin Ali
1980s Bengali-language films
Films directed by Subhash Dutta